The 1922 Tulane Green Wave football team was an American football team that represented Tulane University as a member of the Southern Conference (SoCon) during the 1922 college football season. In its seventh year under head coach Clark Shaughnessy, Tulane compiled a 4–4 record.

Schedule

References

Tulane
Tulane Green Wave football seasons
Tulane Green Wave football